Yengejeh (also known as Angija, Yengejeh Badostan, and Yengidzha) is a village in Bedevostan-e Gharbi Rural District, Khvajeh District, Heris County, East Azerbaijan Province, Iran. At the 2006 census, its population was 151, in 31 families.

References 

Populated places in Heris County